Samson Alfie Philip Robinson (born 9 January 2002) is an English professional footballer who plays for  club Port Vale, as a defender. A former England youth international, he joined Port Vale from Manchester City in January 2022. He helped the club to win promotion out of League Two via the play-offs in four months later.

Club career

Early career
After playing for Leeds United, Robinson joined Manchester City at the age of 14. He was originally a striker at Leeds, then was moved to centre-back at Manchester City and then later to central midfield, before he finally settled at right-back. He represented the Manchester City Academy team in the EFL Trophy on 24 September 2019, in a 2–1 win at Bradford City. He was promoted to the Elite Development Squad in January 2020. He was given the squad number 77, but was sidelined after picking up what coach Brian Barry-Murphy described as a "really bad injury" in August 2020. He made a total of 16 appearances in the Professional Development League, scoring one goal and providing two assists.

Port Vale
Robinson signed an 18-month contract with League Two club Port Vale on 31 January 2022, after manager Darrell Clarke needed cover for the injured Lewis Cass and with James Gibbons; director of football David Flitcroft cited a desire to build a relationship with Manchester City; City retained a sell-on clause. He made his debut at Vale Park on 20 March, coming on as a substitute for David Worrall in a 2–0 win over Sutton United. He was an unused substitute as Vale secured promotion out of the play-offs with victory over Mansfield Town in the final at Wembley Stadium. He made his full debut on 6 August, in a 4–0 defeat at fellow League One newcomers Exeter City, and despite giving away a penalty kick he received praise from Clarke, who said Robinson was "unfairly penalised". Speaking three months later, Robinson said his focus was on improving the defensive aspect of his game.

International career
Robinson won a total of 26 caps representing England at under-15, under-16 and under-17 level.

Style of play
Robinson has been described as a "whole-hearted central defender... who is comfortable in possession". He can play in central defence or at right-back.

Personal life
Robinson is a Leeds United supporter.

Career statistics

Honours
Port Vale
EFL League Two play-offs: 2022

References

2002 births
Living people
Sportspeople from Cheltenham
English footballers
Association football defenders
England youth international footballers
English Football League players
Leeds United F.C. players
Manchester City F.C. players
Port Vale F.C. players